The Eugene Towbin House is a historic house at 16 Broadview Drive in Little Rock, Arkansas.  It was built in 1960 to a design by Hollis Beck, and is a good local example of Mid-Century Modern architecture.  It is a single-story frame structure, its walls finished in vertical board siding and resting on a concrete block foundation.  It is covered by a low-pitch side-facing gabled roof with deep eaves.  The roof extends to the right beyond the main block to also shelter a carport.  Eugene Towbin, for whose family the house was built, was a prominent physician in Little Rock.

The house was listed on the National Register of Historic Places in 2019.

See also
National Register of Historic Places listings in Little Rock, Arkansas

References

Houses on the National Register of Historic Places in Arkansas
Houses completed in 1960
Houses in Little Rock, Arkansas
National Register of Historic Places in Little Rock, Arkansas
1960 establishments in Arkansas